Tatran Střešovice (Tatran Teka Střešovice after its sponsor) is a floorball team based in Prague, Czech Republic. The team was founded in 1991.

The men's team have played in the highest Czech floorball league, Superliga florbalu, since its foundation in 1993. Until the 2011–12 season, the team was the dominant team of the league, winning all titles, except for the 1995–96, 1996–97, 1999–00, and 2008–09 seasons. Overall, the team won 16 titles, the last time in 2014–15 season. It makes it the most successful Czech men floorball team.

Women's team also play the highest Czech floorball league, Extraliga žen ve florbale. The team won the first five seasons of the league.

The club organizes Czech Open, one of the largest international floorball tournaments.

Honours

Titles
Men: 
 Superliga florbalu: 1993–94, 1994–95, 1997–98, 1998–99, 2000–01 through 2007–08, 2009–10 through 2011–12 and 2014–15
 Champions Cup: 2011 (2nd place)
Women:
 Extraliga žen ve florbale: 1994–95 to 1998–99

References

External links
 Official website 
 Club profile 

Czech floorball teams
Sport in Prague